Euxoa lewisi, the oregon dart, is a species of cutworm or dart moth in the family Noctuidae. It is found in North America.

The MONA or Hodges number for Euxoa lewisi is 10718.

Subspecies
These two subspecies belong to the species Euxoa lewisi:
 Euxoa lewisi julia Hardwick, 1968
 Euxoa lewisi lewisi (Grote, 1873)

References

Further reading

 
 
 

Euxoa
Articles created by Qbugbot
Moths described in 1873